Darb Qaleh (also Romanized as Darb Qal‘eh; also known as Dar Qal‘eh, Darqal‘eh, and Dow Qal‘eh) is a village in Ij Rural District, in the Central District of Estahban County, Fars Province, Iran. At the 2006 census, its population was 1,223, in 275 families.

References 

Populated places in Estahban County